Euxoamorpha mendosica is a moth of the family Noctuidae. It is found around Puerto Natales and Punta Arenas in the Magallanes and Antartica Chilena Region of Chile, as well as the Argentine Andes, including the Aconcagua Provincial Park area.

The wingspan is about 35 mm. Adults are on wing from November to February.

External links
 Noctuinae of Chile

Noctuinae
Fauna of Argentina
Fauna of Chile
Moths of South America
Insects of South America